Psy from the Psycho World! is the debut album by South Korean singer Psy. The album was released on January 19, 2001. The album contains 19 songs. Track 11 "I Love Sex" is a re-make of Lee Jung-hyun's song "I Love X", featured on her debut album Let's Go to My Star. The album was also released worldwide through iTunes.

Release and controversy
The full-length debut album is of the rap genre with songs such as "I Love Sex" that include candid lyrics. The title of the album refers to his stage name, a derivative of "psycho", and the album was made just after he attended Berklee College of Music and had returned to South Korea. On his choice of music, he listed rappers Eminem, 2Pac, Jay Z, and Dr. Dre as his musical influences.  He said, "When I was a kid I was just a noisy boy, and I preferred to be in front of people when I was young all the time," and "At that time I was not a good singer; still I'm not a good singer. So when I see the rappers (I thought), 'Oh, talk can be music? Wow. That's for me."

In a 2001 interview with The Dong-a Ilbo, regarding the title of the album and his self description of himself as a "psycho and third-class citizen", he replied that " since the koreans are two-faced  and judgemental based on their academic credentials and lineage, they cannot be first class citizens who are honest, thus should be looked in the perspective of a psycho". He criticized the custom of lip-synching in the song "intro".
The album was very controversial in South Korea because of the "content, dance moves and even his appearance", and could not be sold to minors due to the "vulgarity of the lyrics". His "blatantly aggressive" lyrics appealed to the younger generation of Korean music fans, but five months after the album was released, civic groups stopped its sales citing it as a negative influence for youth, and he was fined for the explicit language.

The songs, which he wrote and produced, have sensational titles such as "Sae (Bird)", "Upskail Phenomenon", "Shocking, Yanggajip Kyusu (a girl from a respectable family)" and the lyrics "mock people with fortunes and their distorted lives".

Adult content
The album was labelled explicit and not for children 4 months after its release after it was found the album booklet contains pictures of condoms, male genitalia, nipples and female underwear.

Title track and music video 
The title track "Bird" was released with a music video that revealed him as a performer with his own style and fashion unlike the stereotypically good-looking male K-pop singers who danced so well. In the video, he is a "thinner, younger Psy" than his later years, and dedicates the song to 'Party Lady', one of the nightclub characters in the video he interacts with, "stealing kisses and cigarettes from". It featured a provocative chorus, setting the tone for his debut to the music scene at a time when social media and the internet were embracing new trends and Korean culture was welcoming "bizarre" things, to his advantage. His "outspoken and uninhibited lyrics" poked fun at current Korean society and cultural norms. During a 2012 interview with Marlow Stern of Newsweek, Psy described the music video as a "huge phenomenon" in South Korea due to its flashy outfits and outrageous dance moves, gaining him the nickname "The Bizarre Singer" from the press.

After "Gangnam Style" generated attention, music critics discussed his performance style in both that music video and this earlier one "Bird", debating whether to call it "comedy hip-hop", a genre that blends humor with rap, like icons Digital Underground and The Fat Boys, or more generally comic or pop oriented.

Critical reception
The album received multiple reviews in 2012 after "Gangnam Style" was released. Of the debut single "Bird", Jeff Benjamin of Billboard said, "[it] established him as a true force of entertainment" and "nicely set up a successful career with the opening declaration, "PSY-cho world, this is PSY!" Houston Press's Corey Deiterman said of "Bird", "this ridiculously catchy bit of funky hip-hop sounds something like an updated version of the American new jack swing movement." Joseph Lapin of OC Weekly said the two tracks "I Love Sex" and "Bird" "echo early '90s rap and R&B beats reminiscent of a strange amalgamation of Busta Rhymes, Cypress Hill and Destiny's Child", and said, "similar to' 90s rappers, Psy had to pay fines for his lyrics, because they were considered inappropriate content....Inappropriateness and controversy are just more reasons to like Psy." Gil Kaufman of MTV News said of the album, "That CD opened the world on his oddball dancing antics and lyrics that turned him into a target of censorship in his country due to content that officials thought might negatively influence young listeners."

Accolades

Track listing

Charts and sales

Monthly charts

Year-end charts

Sales

Notes

References

2001 debut albums
Korean-language albums
Psy albums